Legislative elections were held in the Russian SFSR on 4 March 1990. A total of 1,068 deputies were elected to the Congress of People's Deputies of the RSFSR for a term of five years, 86% of them from the Communist Party; the rest were non-communists. Parties other than the Communist Party of the Soviet Union (CPSU) were now allowed to participate in the election, so the elections were competitive and the Democratic Russia movement, an organization uniting many opposition political groups, won about 190 seats. The elected Congress began its first session on 16 May. Among the elected deputies from the CPSU was Boris Yeltsin, who was then elected by the Congress as Chairman of the Supreme Soviet of RSFSR, effectively the leader of Russia. Many CPSU members, including Yeltsin, subsequently resigned from the CPSU. The CPSU was temporarily banned by Yeltsin in August 1991 in the aftermath of the August Coup, and the CPSU, along with the Soviet Union, collapsed completely by December of the same year.

It was the first and only free election to the Congress of People's Deputies of the RSFSR. It became the Congress of People's Deputies of the Russian Federation after the dissolution of the Soviet Union, and was dissolved by Yeltsin in October 1993 during the Russian constitutional crisis of 1993 and replaced by the Federal Assembly of Russia.

Results

See also
1990 Soviet Union regional elections

Notes

References

Legislative
Russia
Legislative elections in Russia
Legislative
Perestroika
Election and referendum articles with incomplete results
Supreme Soviet of Russia